Ralph Kimball (November 23, 1878 – November 19, 1959) was a justice of the Wyoming Supreme Court from January 3, 1921, to January 7, 1952.

Born in Nevada, Missouri, Kimball spent two years as an aide to a Missouri Congressman in Washington, D.C., then returned to Missouri. After his admission to the bar in 1899, he relocated to Lander, Wyoming in 1901.

References

Justices of the Wyoming Supreme Court
1878 births
1959 deaths
People from Nevada, Missouri
People from Lander, Wyoming